Fayette County School District  is a school district in Fayette County, Alabama.

External links
 

School districts in Alabama